is a fictional monster, or kaiju, which first appeared in Ishirō Honda's 1964 film Ghidorah, the Three-Headed Monster. Although the name of the character is officially trademarked by Toho as "King Ghidorah", the character was originally referred to as Ghidorah or Ghidrah in some English markets.

Although King Ghidorah's design has remained largely consistent throughout its appearances (an armless, bipedal, golden and yellowish-scaled dragon with three heads, two fan-shaped wings and two tails), its origin story has varied from being an extraterrestrial planet-destroying dragon, a genetically engineered monster from the future, a guardian monster of ancient Japan, or a god from another dimension. The character is usually portrayed as an archenemy of Godzilla and a foe of Mothra, though it has had one appearance as an ally of the latter.

Despite rumors that Ghidorah was meant to represent the threat posed by China, which had at the time of the character's creation just developed nuclear weapons, director Ishirō Honda denied the connection and stated that Ghidorah was simply a modern take on the dragon Yamata no Orochi.

Overview

Development
The initial idea for Ghidorah, the Three-Headed Monster came from Tomoyuki Tanaka, who also created Godzilla. Tanaka's inspiration came from illustration of the Lernaean Hydra in a book about Greek Mythology, and Orochi of Japanese folklore. Tanaka was enamored with the idea of Godzilla fighting a multi-headed serpent, but considered seven or eight heads to be too excessive, and thus the number of heads was reduced to three. The final version was a three-headed dragon with large wings, two tails and of extraterrestrial origin.

Toho also drew inspiration from the three-headed dragon Zmey Gorynych or King Dragon  in Japanese version from the 1956 Soviet film Ilya Muromets, which had been distributed theatrically in Japan by Shintoho in March 1959.

Other sources of inspiration included mythological creatures such as the hydra, unicorn, pegasus, and qilin.

Shōwa era (1964–1973)

In its debut film, Ghidorah, the Three-Headed Monster, Ghidorah is portrayed as an ancient extraterrestrial entity responsible for the destruction of the Venusian civilization, five thousand years before the film's events. Its attempt to destroy Earth is thwarted by the combined efforts of Godzilla, Rodan and Mothra.

Subsequent Shōwa era films would portray Ghidorah as the pawn of various alien races seeking to subjugate Earth. King Ghidorah also appears in the fifth and sixth episodes of the television series Zone Fighter, where it is revealed that it is supposedly a creation of the Garoga aliens, though it is left unclear as to whether this statement is true or not.

Screenwriter Shinichi Sekizawa insisted that the Ghidorah suit be fabricated using light-weight silicone-based materials in order to grant the wearer greater mobility. The final Ghidorah design was constructed by special effects artist Teizo Toshimitsu, who had initially painted it green in order to further differentiate it from Godzilla, Rodan and Mothra, but changed it to gold on the insistence of Eiji Tsuburaya, after his assistant noted that being a creature from Venus, the "gold planet", Ghidorah should be that color.

The monster suit itself was built by Akira Watanabe, and worn by Shoichi Hirose. Hirose walked hunched over inside the Ghidorah costume, holding a metal bar for balance, while puppeteers would control its heads, tails and wings off-camera like a marionette. The monster's heads were each fitted with remotely controlled motors, which were connected to operators via a wire extending from the suit's backside.

Performing as Ghidorah proved challenging to Hirose, as he had to time his movements in a way that would not conflict with the separately operated heads and wings, as doing so would have resulted in the overhead wires tangling. Because of the suit's weight, it frequently snapped the overhead wires supporting it. Special effects were added as the creature is capable emitting destructive, lightning-like "gravity beams" from its mouths and generating hurricane-force winds from its wings.

Despite King Ghidorah's central role in the film's plot, the character was given little screen time, as Hirose had fallen out with special effects director Eiji Tsuburaya, who never forgave Hirose for accepting a Hollywood deal, and subsequently he hired Susumu Utsumi to play King Ghidorah after Invasion of Astro-Monster. In that film, King Ghidorah was given a darker shade of gold, and its movements both on land and in the air were more fluid than during Ghidorah the Three-Headed Monster, as the special effects crew had at that point learned from the shortcomings of the previous film's depiction of the creature.

Heisei era (1991–1998)

In Godzilla vs. King Ghidorah (1991), the creature is re-envisioned as a trio of diminutive genetically engineered creatures called Dorats owned by a group of humans from the 23rd century known as the Equal Environment Earth Union, a group dedicated to equalizing the power of Earth's nations. Seeking to stop Japan's global economic dominance in their timeline by transforming the Dorats into King Ghidorah through nuclear exposure, the Earth Unionists plant the Dorats on Lagos Island during the 1954 H-bomb tests there. Prior to doing so, they remove the dinosaur that would ultimately become Godzilla from the island, so that King Ghidorah would be able to attack Japan without opposition. In 1992, the Earth Unionists unleash Ghidorah onto Japan, but he is defeated by a recreated Godzilla. King Ghidorah's body stays under the ocean for two centuries before being recovered by a defected Earth Unionist to make it a cyborg and sent back to 1992 as Mecha-King Ghidorah in order to stop Godzilla's rampage.

The character's manes were deleted and replaced with horns, as it proved difficult for the special effects team to superimpose the manes into footage of people escaping the monster. Special effects director Koichi Kawakita had originally planned on having each of Ghidorah's heads fire differently colored beams, but this was ultimately scrapped in favor of the classic yellow color. This version of King Ghidorah was portrayed by Hurricane Ryu.

In Godzilla vs. Mechagodzilla II (1993), Mecha-King Ghidorah's remains are salvaged by the United Nations Godzilla Countermeasures Center (UNGCC) and used to build Mechagodzilla.

In Rebirth of Mothra, a monster named Desghidorah appears, who heavily resembles King Ghidorah but has graphite black skin and a quadrupedal stance.

In Rebirth of Mothra III (1998), King Ghidorah is depicted as an extraterrestrial that landed on earth during the Cretaceous Period of the Mesozoic Era and wiped out the dinosaurs by draining them of their life energies. Ghidorah left Earth and returns in modern times to feed on human children. Mothra Leo fails to defeat the monster and travels back to the Cretaceous in order to kill Ghidorah retroactively. Leo defeats the younger Ghidorah, but the monster's severed tail allows it to regenerate back into its adult form in modern times. After hibernating from the Cretaceous era to the present day, aided by the ancient Primitive Mothra species, Leo finally kills the monster by transforming into a new form: "Armor Mothra". This version of King Ghidorah was portrayed by Tsutomu Kitagawa.

Millennium era (2001)

In Godzilla, Mothra and King Ghidorah: Giant Monsters All-Out Attack, Ghidorah is portrayed as having been one of the three Guardians of Yamato, originating 1,000 years before the events of the film. Initially an antagonist, Ghidorah was imprisoned in Mount Fuji, only to be reawakened in 2001 to halt Godzilla's destruction of Tokyo. Ghidorah is defeated, but then revived and empowered by ally Mothra.

Director Shūsuke Kaneko had originally planned on using Varan as Godzilla's principal antagonist, but was pressured by Toho chairman Isao Matsuoka to use the more recognizable and profitable King Ghidorah, as the previous film in the franchise, Godzilla vs. Megaguirus, which featured an original and unfamiliar antagonist, was a box office and critical failure. In order to emphasize Ghidorah's heroic role in the movie, the creature's size was greatly reduced, and was portrayed by Akira Ohashi, who moved the creature's heads as hand puppets.

In Godzilla: Final Wars, a kaiju called Keiser Ghidorah appears being based on Ghidorah as the true form of Monster X.

Anime trilogy (2018)
Ghidorah is referenced by Metphies in a post-credits scene for Godzilla: City on the Edge of Battle and is featured in Godzilla: The Planet Eater. The anime incarnation of Ghidorah is markedly different from his original portrayal, having evolved to the point of discarding his physical body in favor of a form of pure astral energy with two tails, two wings, and three necks that reach at least 20 kilometers in length, stretching out of three black hole-like portals to devour planets sacrificed to him by the Exif cult with his gravitational powers while his torso remains within an alternate dimension. In this state, King Ghidorah is completely invulnerable as long as his 'anchor' remains alive, and is capable of completely ignoring the laws of physics of the dimensions he invades, with his powers including intangibility, the manipulation of thermodynamics, gravity and time through time dilation.

In the anime, Ghidorah is the deity worshipped by the Exif under the titles of "Wings of Death", "Golden Demise", and "God of Destruction". He is summoned to Earth by Metphies and his cult in order to destroy Godzilla and devour Earth just as they fed him other planets they visited and converted to the Exif faith. Virtually invincible due to his defiance of physics, it is only when his link to this universe (in this case, Metphies) is broken that he can be affected by conventional physical laws, allowing Godzilla to disperse, defeat, and effectively banish him back to his realm of reality for the time being.

MonsterVerse (2019–2021)

In 2014, Legendary Pictures announced their acquisition of the licenses to Rodan, Mothra and King Ghidorah from Toho to use in their MonsterVerse franchise. The trio were introduced in Kong: Skull Island in a post-credits scene depicting cave paintings of all three monsters, including Godzilla.

In June 2017, a press release confirmed Rodan, Mothra, and King Ghidorah would all be featured in Godzilla: King of the Monsters. In April 2018, Jason Liles, Alan Maxson, and Richard Dorton were cast to provide the motion capture performances of the heads of King Ghidorah, with Liles performing the middle head, Maxson performing the right head, and Dorton performing the left head. Other actors would perform the rest of King Ghidorah's body. This version of Ghidorah stands 521 ft (158.8 m) tall, weighing 141,056 tons with an unknown wingspan that allows it to fly at a maximum speed of 550 knots. Unlike previous incarnations of the character, here Ghidorah's three heads are portrayed with independent personalities from each other, although Ghidorah still exhibits the inherent sadism of most incarnations: the middle head is the leader and more prominently sadistic than the other two, the right head is angry and thirsty for battle, and the left head is curious and slightly more docile - the heads are officially named Ichi, Ni and San respectively (meaning "One", "Two" and "Three" in Japanese). It is referred to as "Monster Zero" (a reference to Invasion of Astro-Monster) by the organization Monarch. According to Monarch's database, ancient civilizations called the monster "Ghidorah".

In the film, King Ghidorah is portrayed as a rival apex predator to Godzilla that originated from another world (how exactly it traveled through space to Earth is unclear), who actively seeks to usurp Godzilla's domination of the other monsters, and unlike Godzilla, he is actively hostile towards humanity whilst threatening to destroy Earth's natural order. It's briefly speculated in the film that Ghidorah's motive for attempting to inflict an extinction event on the Earth's ecosphere might be terraforming the planet into a more ideal environment for himself, but the novelization at one point suggests when discussing the said theory that maybe Ghidorah is just motivated by hatred of every living thing that isn't him. Referenced in various myths and said to be the inspiration for the beasts in humanity's various Chaoskampf stories, King Ghidorah is shown through ancient cave paintings to have fought against Godzilla and/or its species in the past before, but its nature scared ancient humans enough that the info contained in those myths was left incomplete. King Ghidorah ended up being frozen in Antarctica, discovered sometime after 1973 by Monarch who proceeded to study the monster until it was freed by eco-terrorists led by Alan Jonah. Godzilla is attracted to Ghidorah's activity and they engage in a short battle, but Ghidorah retreats when Monarch's military forces intervene; proceeding to Mexico, where Rodan is awoken from its hibernation inside a volcano.

Ghidorah forces Rodan into submission but is then attacked by Godzilla again, who manages to gain the upper hand by dragging the flying monster into the ocean. Godzilla is nearly victorious after he completely bites off Ghidorah's left head, but in desperation, the human military attempts to kill both Ghidorah and Godzilla by detonating a new weapon called the Oxygen Destroyer. Caught in the blast's center; the weapon almost kills Godzilla but is revealed to have no effect on Ghidorah, who flies back to land and within minutes, fully regenerates his severed head, which would eventually allow the humans to discover that he is in fact an alien. With Godzilla seemingly defeated, Ghidorah becomes the new "alpha" or "king of the monsters", and puts out a worldwide call that awakens all of the Earth's Titans, and commands them to aid him in destroying human civilization and inflicting an extinction event that could wipe out all complex life on Earth, with Rodan as his right hand. Ghidorah even starts causing massive electrical storms in the eastern United States, radically altering climate conditions.

When Ghidorah comes to Boston to destroy the Orca device that is negating its hold over the Titans, it battles a revived Godzilla while Mothra fights Rodan. This time, Ghidorah defeats Godzilla after empowering himself by feeding on the city's energy supply and throwing Godzilla from a high altitude but is stopped from killing him thanks to distractions from Mothra (who is killed by Ghidorah in an act of self-sacrifice) and the humans. Godzilla recovers by absorbing Mothra's life force and uses the resulting power boost to unleash a series of thermonuclear pulses that obliterate Ghidorah completely. In a post-credits scene, Jonah and his men are shown a previously-decapitated head of Ghidorah from a fisherman in Mexico. He tells the fisherman, "We'll take it."

In the 2021 sequel, Godzilla vs. Kong, set 5 years after the events of King of the Monsters, Ghidorah's severed head is being used by Apex Cybernetics' Ren Serizawa (portrayed by Shun Oguri) to telepathically interface with Mechagodzilla's body. Godzilla senses his fallen rival's presence, which prompts him to attack the Apex facilities where Mechagodzilla is being built. Eventually, what's left of Ghidorah's consciousness takes control of the cybernetic Titan, killing Apex CEO Walter Simmons and electrocuting Ren Serizawa, before battling Godzilla in Hong Kong. Ghidorah's influence on Mechagodzilla is evident from his desire for unabridged destruction and the senseless killing of humans. Mechagodzilla is finally destroyed by the combined efforts of Godzilla and Kong. In the novelization, Ren's death is changed so that instead of being electrocuted, his mind is trapped inside Mechagodzilla and overwritten by the Ghidorah-derived mind, and the novel drops hints that Ghidorah's consciousness may have possessed Ren's body and escaped afterwards.

Abilities

King Ghidorah's abilities, common to all his appearances, are flight and his gravity beams.

In Ghidorah, the Three-Headed Monster, the first incarnation is shown travelling through space within a meteor capable of generating magnetic fields.

In Godzilla vs. King Ghidorah, King Ghidorah can constrict his enemies with his necks.
The Mecha-King Ghidorah version is equipped with a Triple Laser Cannon fired from its robotic head, electrified grapples and a mechanical arm in its chest for capturing Godzilla.

In Rebirth of Mothra III, King Ghidorah gains energy from eating victims and can construct a dome to house its victims for future consumption. It is also portrayed as capable of firing lightning bolts from its wings, hypnotize, spit fireballs and regenerating its entire body from severed body parts.

In Godzilla, Mothra and King Ghidorah: Giant Monsters All-Out Attack(G.M.K) King Ghidorah can inflict electric shocks to his enemies by biting them, gain power by absorbing the energy of dead monsters and form an energy shield capable of deflecting Godzilla's atomic breath.

In Godzilla: The Planet Eater, the third part of an animated trilogy, Ghidorah is depicted as an evolved entity from a universe with different physical laws that are worshiped by the Exif, who he influenced to become nihilists upon mastering advanced Gematron mathematics. While Ghidorah consumed the Exifs' homeworld, their first offering to him, through his gravitational powers, a few priests were spared and traveled to other worlds where they established cults while meeting the conditions for Ghidorah to physically manifest as a shadow to consume sacrificial offering through their shadows before his heads finally emerge through black holes. His necks extend to infinite lengths, nigh-invisible to machines save for the gravitational energy he emanates, strong enough to deflect Godzilla's heat ray or actually bend space. As long as someone native to the dimension he invades acts as his guiding anchor and witness, Ghidorah can defy that universe's physics, able to render himself intangible to enemy attacks whilst still capable of assaulting foes normally. He can even distort space-time and erode reality, able to change people's chronological perception of events and nearly succeeding in "erasing" Godzilla from existence. Though his avatar was rendered tangible to physics by the loss of connection to the priest serving as his key witness (thus allowing Godzilla to destroy his projection through reality), Ghidorah was simply banished back to his dimension, awaiting for another individual to serve as his link to open up his next chance to enter reality and feast.

In Godzilla: King of the Monsters, Ghidorah has a divergent frontal lobe density in each of its heads, rendering each head capable of independent thoughts. Its scales are capable of running bioelectrical currents through its body and its dermal layer is coated with aurum. It can generate "hurricane-force" winds (recorded at 217 mph, later stated to be 400 mph according to the graphic novel Kingdom Kong) due to the hyper-tensile muscle tendons of the wings as he flies at 550 knots (Mach 0.8, as opposed to the Mach 3 flight speed of previous incarnations). Its body's electro-receptor molecular biology can create electrical currents and localized storm systems as it travels. This results in the stratosphere being torn open by thunder and lightning as it takes flight. After ‘consuming’ all of Boston's electric power grid by chomping down on a power substation, King Ghidorah is able to unleash chain lightning from the tips of the bones in his wings (referencing his Rebirth of Mothra 3 incarnation) and later shows more of his vampiric, energy-draining capabilities when he chomps down on Godzilla in a nearly successful attempt to siphon away Godzilla's remaining nuclear energy along with the power boost Mothra's ashes provided him (referencing a similar attempt made by Kaiser Ghidorah in Godzilla: Final Wars). As an alpha, Ghidorah's roar is able to awaken and influence other titans around the world into rampaging in the wake of Godzilla's supposed death, having taken over as king. Halfway through the film, he displays two "unnatural" abilities that were attributed to - and served as evidence of - his alien nature. The first is the durability to withstand the Oxygen Destroyer, emerging unscathed from the same detonation which severely injured Godzilla and killed all Earth-based lifeforms within a two-mile radius. The second is the possession of highly accelerated regenerative properties, having regrown the left head minutes after Godzilla tore it off, retaining the memories and personality since Ghidorah's neurons are spread throughout his body like in an octopus. However, according to the official novelization, a store of energy must be absorbed to do so, which Ghidorah acquired from the highly-radioactive lava of Rodan's volcano. Later on, the same power substation Ghidorah consumed to boost himself also healed up the wounds on his wing membranes immediately after he fired lightning from the tips of his wings. Eventually, Godzilla succeeded in incinerating Ghidorah's wings, side heads, body, and finally, the middle head, to prevent the alien dragon from coming back. However, Ghidorah was not entirely destroyed, for the head Godzilla bit off during the fight in Mexico remained intact and was salvaged.

In Godzilla vs. Kong, it is revealed that Ghidorah's heads communicated with each other via telepathy, as his necks were so long that communication via the nervous system was impractical. Apex Cybernetics, which has acquired Ghidorah's skull and brain, is using these telepathic abilities as the basis of a psychic control system for Mechagodzilla. Once Mechagodzilla received an energy source sufficient to power it properly, Ghidorah's mind suddenly transferred itself to this new body, frying the pilot to death as he seized total control of the robot.

Reception
The character has been well-received and is considered to be the most famous enemy of Godzilla. IGN listed the creature as #2 on their "Top 10 Japanese Movie Monsters" list. Complex listed the character as #4 on its "The 15 Most Badass Kaiju Monsters of All Time" list, calling it "iconic" and saying that it "... simply looks cooler than some of the more powerful bugs, crabs, and robots."

In his review of Ghidorah, the Three-Headed Monster, Ethan Reed of Toho Kingdom praised King Ghidorah, calling it "a fantastic addition to the franchise" and "no less than pure evil, a relentless force of destruction that wipes out the life of entire planets just for the sake of it" and concluded that "King Ghidorah is not only one [of] the best characters in the series, but one [of] the best movie villains as well." Similar views were expressed in Paste, which listed Ghidorah as #5 on its "10 Best Movie Dragons", describing it as "probably the deadliest beast in all of Godzilla lore".

Godzilla historian Steve Ryfle, however, has criticized Ghidorah's design in Godzilla vs. King Ghidorah, citing its stiff movements and recycled Rodan roar, as well as noting that it did not deviate enough from Eiji Tsuburaya's original design.

Following the release of King of the Monsters, Ghidorah's left head has gained the nickname "Kev/Kevin". This was following an announcement by Mike Dougherty who released a tweet with the names of Ghidorah's head. Due to his seemingly unique personality, Kevin has become the subject of memes.

Appearances
King Ghidorah appeared in a brief piece of stock footage in Terror of Mechagodzilla. The mechanical head of Mecha-King Ghidorah appears briefly in the opening of Godzilla vs. Mechagodzilla II. Stock footage of King Ghidorah was used in four episodes of Courage the Cowardly Dog: Courage in the Big Stinkin' City, The Tower of Dr. Zalost, Fishy Business and Nowhere TV. Spin-off characters based on King Ghidorah (although quadrupedal in appearance) were featured in other Toho films: Desghidorah in Rebirth of Mothra and Keizer Ghidorah in Godzilla: Final Wars. A post-credits scene in Kong: Skull Island depicts cave paintings of Godzilla, Rodan, Mothra and King Ghidorah. It was implied that King Ghidorah took over Mechagodzilla's conscience in Godzilla vs. Kong.

Films

 Ghidorah, the Three-Headed Monster (1964)
 Invasion of Astro-Monster (1965)
 Destroy All Monsters (1968)
 Godzilla vs. Gigan (1972)
 Godzilla vs. King Ghidorah (1991)
 Rebirth of Mothra III (1998)
 Godzilla, Mothra and King Ghidorah: Giant Monsters All-Out Attack (2001)
 Godzilla: The Planet Eater (2018)
 Godzilla: King of the Monsters (2019)

Television

 Zone Fighter (1973)
 Godzilla Island (1997-1998)

Video games
 Godzilla: Monster of Monsters (NES - 1988)
 Godzilla (Game Boy - 1990)
 Godzilla 2: War of the Monsters (NES - 1991)
 Battle Soccer: Field no Hasha (SNES - 1992)
 Super Godzilla (SNES - 1993)
 Kaijū-ō Godzilla / King of the Monsters, Godzilla (Game Boy - 1993)
 Godzilla: Battle Legends (Turbo Duo - 1993)
 Godzilla: Monster War / Godzilla: Destroy All Monsters (Super Famicom - 1994)
 Godzilla Giant Monster March (Game Gear - 1995)
 Godzilla Trading Battle (PlayStation - 1998)
 Godzilla Generations: Maximum Impact (Dreamcast - 1999)
 Godzilla: Destroy All Monsters Melee (GCN, Xbox - 2002/2003)
 Godzilla: Domination! (GBA - 2002)
 Godzilla: Save the Earth (Xbox, PS2 - 2004)
 Godzilla: Unleashed (Wii, PS2 - 2007)
 Godzilla Unleashed: Double Smash (NDS - 2007)
 Godzilla (PS3 - 2014 PS3 PS4 - 2015)
 City Shrouded in Shadow (PS4 - 2017)
 Godzilla Defense Force (2019)
 Unnamed MonsterVerse Mobile Game(2019)

Literature
 Godzilla vs. King Ghidorah (manga - 1991)
 Godzilla Saves America: A Monster Showdown in 3-D! (1996)
 Godzilla 2000 (novel - 1997)
 Godzilla vs. the Robot Monsters (novel - 1998)
 Godzilla vs. the Space Monster (novel - 1998)
 Godzilla: Kingdom of Monsters (comic - 2011–2012)
 Godzilla: Gangsters & Goliaths (comic - 2011)
 Godzilla: Legends (comic - 2011–2012)
 Godzilla: The Half-Century War (comic - 2012–2013)
 Godzilla: Rulers of Earth (comic - 2013–2015)
 Godzilla: Cataclysm (comic - 2014)
 Godzilla in Hell (comic - 2015)
 Godzilla: Oblivion (comic - 2016)
 Godzilla Rivals (comic - 2022)

Other
 British-American hip hop artist Daniel Dumile (known primarily as MF Doom) released the album Take Me To Your Leader (2003) using the artist name "King Geedorah". The album's cover art features an image resembling King Ghidorah and the album features samples from the English versions of various Godzilla films.
 In 2022, a species of branching worm was named after the monster, Ramisyllis kingghidorahi, discovered in the waters around Sado Island. According to scientist Maria Teresa Aguado, the name was selected as "King Ghidorah is a branching fictitious animal that can regenerate its lost ends, so we thought this was an appropriate name for the new species of branching worm".

See also
 Hydreigon

References

Citations

General sources
 
 
 
 
 
 
 
 
 
 
 
 
 

Extraterrestrial supervillains
Fictional dragons
Fictional characters with electric or magnetic abilities
Fictional mass murderers
Fictional monsters
Fictional kings
Film characters introduced in 1964
Godzilla characters
Horror film villains
Kaiju
Toho monsters
Fictional people from the 23rd-century
Male characters in film